Charles Morgan Thomson (11 December 1910 – 8 May 1984) was a Scottish footballer who played for Sunderland and  Scotland as a right half.

Club career
Thomson made his debut for Sunderland on 3 October 1931 in a 2–2 tie against the Blackburn Rovers at Roker Park. His achievements while at Sunderland include winning the English Football League Championship in the 1935–36 season, the 1936 FA Charity Shield and the FA Cup in 1937. He made 264 appearances and scored eight goals over his career at Sunderland.

International career
He won his only international cap for Scotland against Czechoslovakia on 15 May 1937 in a 3–1 win at Stadion Sparta-Letna. He wasn't capped again for his country, and retired in 1939 due to the outbreak of the Second World War.

References

1910 births
Scottish footballers
Scotland international footballers
Sunderland A.F.C. players
1984 deaths
English Football League players
Footballers from Glasgow
Association football wing halves
Pollok F.C. players
Scottish Junior Football Association players
FA Cup Final players